Abderrahmane Boubekeur (born 1931-03-13) is an Algerian footballer. He played in 7 matches for the Algeria national football team.

References

External links 

1931 births
1999 deaths
Algerian footballers
Algeria international footballers
Association football goalkeepers
AS Monaco FC players
Ligue 1 players
Footballers from Algiers